The 156th Pennsylvania House of Representatives District is located in Chester County and includes the following areas:

 Birmingham Township
 East Goshen Township
 Thornbury Township
 West Chester
 West Goshen Township (PART, District North)
 Westtown Township

Representatives

References

Government of Chester County, Pennsylvania
156